Tingena innotella is a species of moth in the family Oecophoridae. It is endemic to New Zealand and is found in both the North and South Islands. This species inhabits open native forest or scrubland and adults are on the wing from December to March. T. innotella appears to have an affinity for the silver tree fern.

Taxonomy 
This species was first described by Frances Walker in 1864 using specimen collected by D. Bolton in Auckland and named Gelechia innotella. In 1915 Edward Meyrick placed this species within the Borkhausenia genus.  George Hudson discussed this species under the name Borkhausenia innotella and illustrated the species under the name Borkhausenia politis in his 1928 publication The butterflies and moths of New Zealand. In 1988 J. S. Dugdale placed this species in the genus Tingena. In the same publication Dugdale synonymised both Gelechia monospilella and Oecophora politis with this species.  For G. monospilella, Dugdale justified this synonymisation as the external characters of the holotype of G.  monospilella were indistinguishable from the paralectotype of T. innotella.  As regards O. politis,  Dugdale noted that he doubted if the holotype of O. politis was the same as Meyrick and Hudson's concept of this taxon. He raised this doubt as the original description of O. politis emphasised the "whitish-ochreous" ground colour of the specimen being described. However he justified his synonymisation as Alfred Philpott's illustrations of the genitalia of O. politis in his 1926 publication agrees with T. innotella specimens collected by Hudson in Wellington post 1887 and sent to Meyrick.  However Dugdale did point out that these specimens have a brown ground colour rather than a white-ochreous ground colour. The female lectotype is held at the Natural History Museum, London.

Description 

Walker originally described this species as follows:

Hudson described the species as follows:
There is variation in both the depth of ground colour of this species as well as how distinctive the markings on the forewings are.

Distribution 
This species is endemic to New Zealand and has been observed in location such as Whangārei, Auckland, Napier, Wellington, Nelson, Christchurch, Castle Hill, Dunedin and Invercargill.

Behaviour 

Adults of this species are on the wing from December until March. This species has an affinity for the silver tree fern.

Habitat 
This species prefers open native forest or scrub habitat.

References

Oecophoridae
Moths of New Zealand
Moths described in 1864
Endemic fauna of New Zealand
Taxa named by Francis Walker (entomologist)
Endemic moths of New Zealand